The Eastern Pennsylvania Rugby Union is the Geographical Union (GU) for rugby union teams playing in Eastern Pennsylvania. It is an association of youth, high school, collegiate, and adult men's and women's rugby teams in eastern Pennsylvania of the United States under USA Rugby.

See also
Rugby union in the United States

References

External links
Official website
USA Rugby Official Site
World Rugby Official Site

Rugby union teams in Pennsylvania
Rugby union governing bodies in the United States
Sports organizations established in 2013
Rugby union in Pennsylvania
2013 establishments in Pennsylvania